Psalm 39 is the 39th psalm of the Book of Psalms, beginning in English in the King James Version: "I said, I will take heed to my ways, that I sin not with my tongue". The Book of Psalms is part of the third section of the Hebrew Bible, and a book of the Christian Old Testament. In the slightly different numbering system used in the Greek Septuagint and Latin Vulgate translations of the Bible, this psalm is Psalm 38. In Latin, it is known as "Dixi custodiam vias meas". It is a meditation on the fragility of man before God, ending in a prayer for a peaceful life.

The psalm forms a regular part of Jewish, Catholic, Lutheran, Anglican and other Protestant liturgies and is appointed in the Anglican Book of Common Prayer to be read at funerals. It has inspired hymns based on it, and has often been set to music. It was set by Baroque composers such as Heinrich Schütz, and single verses were used prominently in major works by Johannes Brahms in Ein deutsches Requiem and by Igor Stravinsky in his Symphony of Psalms.

Text

Hebrew Bible version
Following is the Hebrew text of Psalm 39:

King James Version
 I said, I will take heed to my ways, that I sin not with my tongue: I will keep my mouth with a bridle, while the wicked is before me.
 I was dumb with silence, I held my peace, even from good; and my sorrow was stirred.
 My heart was hot within me, while I was musing the fire burned: then spake I with my tongue,
 LORD, make me to know mine end, and the measure of my days, what it is: that I may know how frail I am.
 Behold, thou hast made my days as an handbreadth; and mine age is as nothing before thee: verily every man at his best state is altogether vanity. Selah.
 Surely every man walketh in a vain shew: surely they are disquieted in vain: he heapeth up riches, and knoweth not who shall gather them.
 And now, Lord, what wait I for? my hope is in thee.
 Deliver me from all my transgressions: make me not the reproach of the foolish.
 I was dumb, I opened not my mouth; because thou didst it.
 Remove thy stroke away from me: I am consumed by the blow of thine hand.
 When thou with rebukes dost correct man for iniquity, thou makest his beauty to consume away like a moth: surely every man is vanity. Selah.
 Hear my prayer, O LORD, and give ear unto my cry; hold not thy peace at my tears: for I am a stranger with thee, and a sojourner, as all my fathers were.
 O spare me, that I may recover strength, before I go hence, and be no more.

Background and themes
According to the Talmud (Bava Batra 14a–b), this is one of the ten psalms authored by Moses. Matthew Henry attributes it to David, stating that he must have been in emotional turmoil or beset by enemies when he wrote the psalm, and struggled to wait patiently for God's salvation.

According to Brueggemann and Bellinger, "Psalm 39 articulates hope and despair simultaneously", as it tries to come to terms with "the transience and troubles of life". Other Christian scholars see the psalm as an analogy to one's sins, where "he" is representative of the "members of his body" (Christians). Adam Clarke summarizes the psalm as follows: "Faith has always to struggle with difficulties. Though he was confident that God was his hope, yet ... troubles of life come ever into his memory; his prayer is that his God will provide for him". Charles Spurgeon sees the psalm saying there is a time to be silent and a time to speak, while Hans Werner sees an inner struggle for David to control his tongue.

Rabbeinu Bachya teaches on verse 12, which mentions both prayer and tears, that "prayer needs tears".

Structure
The numbering of the verses differs between the Hebrew and Latin versions.

Clarke holds that the psalm:
 relates the care and watchfulness over one's thoughts, tongue, and actions, v1–3;
 considers the brevity and uncertainty of human life, v4–7;
 prays for deliverance from sin, v8–11; and
 asks that the author be protected and spared until he is fitted for another world, v12, 13.

Spurgeon broke the psalm down as follows:
 Burdened with many sorrows v1–2;
 Prayer in his torment v 3–6;
 Submission to God v7–13;
 Relief and trust.

The Old Testament scholar Hermann Gunkel, in his standard work The Psalms, believes the structuring of the verses was originally:
 Vers 2–4: Introduction to and emergence of the poem
 Vers 5ff: The actual poem
 Vers 5–7 and 12: General considerations
 Vers 8 and 13c.d: Return to yourself
 Vers 13a.b, 9–11 and Vers 14: The actual dirge

Heading
The heading, verse 1 in the Hebrew text, addresses the song to Jeduthun. According to Rashi, this refers either to one of the Levite singers or to the name of a musical instrument. Psalms 62 and 77 are also addressed to Jeduthun.

Uses

Judaism
Verse 13 is part of Selichot.

Catholic Church
Traditionally, this psalm was recited or sung in monasteries during the Monday of matins, according to the rule of Saint Benedict of 530 AD. In the current Liturgy of the Hours, it is sung or recited in the Office of Readings on the Wednesday of the second week of the four-weekly cycle of liturgical prayers.

Book of Common Prayer
In the Church of England's Book of Common Prayer, this psalm is appointed to be read on the morning of the eighth day of the month.

Hebel est omnia Adam
William Brewster, one of the Pilgrim Fathers, used the motto Hebel est omnia Adam, a Hebrew–Latin phrase taken from verse 5, next to his signature to indicate the vanity of man.

Musical settings 
Hymns paraphrasing Psalm 39 include "Almighty maker of my frame" by Anne Steele.

Heinrich Schütz set the psalm in German with the text from the Becker Psalter, "In meinem Herzen hab ich mir" (In my heart I [told] myself), for choir as his SWV 136. Verses 4 to 7 in German, "Herr, lehre doch mich" (Lord, teach me) are used in the third movement of Ein deutsches Requiem by Johannes Brahms, for baritone, choir and orchestra. Verses 13 and 14 in Latin are used in the first movement of the Symphony of Psalms by Igor Stravinsky.

The text of the psalm in English (verses 4 onwards) has been set to music as a motet by Maurice Greene, and by Sir Hubert Parry as the final of six motets in his choral work Songs of Farewell. Both works are entitled "Lord, Let Me Know Mine End".

References

External links 

 
 
 Psalms Chapter 39 text in Hebrew and English, mechon-mamre.org
 Psalm 39 – Wisdom to Speak Under God’s Correction text and detailed commentary, enduringword.com
 For the leader, for Jeduthun. A psalm of David. / I said, "I will watch my ways, lest I sin with my tongue" text and footnotes, usccb.org United States Conference of Catholic Bishops
 Psalm 39:1 introduction and text, biblestudytools.com
 Psalm 39 / Refrain: Lord, let me know my end and the number of my days Church of England
 Psalm 39 at biblegateway.com
 Hymns for Psalm 39 hymnary.org

039
Works attributed to David